is a Japanese retired football player.

Club statistics
Updated to 23 February 2020.

References

External links
Profile at Kagoshima United FC

1987 births
Living people
Fukuoka University alumni
Association football people from Gifu Prefecture
Japanese footballers
J2 League players
J3 League players
Japan Football League players
FC Gifu players
Fujieda MYFC players
Kagoshima United FC players
Association football defenders